John Newcombe and Tony Roche were the defending champions, but Newcombe did not compete. Roche partnered with Colin Dibley but lost in the quarterfinals to Dick Crealy and Nikola Pilić.

Vitas Gerulaitis and Sandy Mayer defeated Colin Dowdeswell and Allan Stone in the final, 7–5, 8–6, 6–4 to win the gentlemen's doubles title at the 1975 Wimbledon Championships.

Seeds

  Brian Gottfried /  Raúl Ramírez (second round)
  Jimmy Connors /  Ilie Năstase (second round)
  Bob Hewitt /  Frew McMillan (quarterfinals)
  Bob Lutz /  Stan Smith (third round)
  John Alexander /  Phil Dent (second round)
  Mark Cox /  Roger Taylor (third round)
  Tom Okker /  Marty Riessen (third round)
  Arthur Ashe /  Erik van Dillen (second round)

Draw

Finals

Top half

Section 1

Section 2

Bottom half

Section 3

Section 4

References

External links

1975 Wimbledon Championships – Men's draws and results at the International Tennis Federation

Men's Doubles
Wimbledon Championship by year – Men's doubles